The Badminton Association of Malaysia or BAM (Malay: Persatuan Badminton Malaysia) is the governing body of badminton in Malaysia. The association was founded in 1964. Nevertheless, the history of Malaysian badminton starts much earlier. Already in 1934 an association was founded by the provinces Perak, Penang, Selangor, Johore and Singapore.

BAM is registered with the Sports Commissioner's Office under the Sports Development Act 1997 of the Laws of Malaysia. The association was founded in 1964 and has 15 states as their members.

History of Formation
1809: Badminton brought to Malaya by officers of the East India Company in Penang
Early 1900s: Promoted by British through mission schools especially in Penang, Melaka, Ipoh, Kuala Lumpur and Singapore
1925: Penang becomes first state to form its own state badminton association (Penang Badminton Association)
1929: Perak forms its own state badminton association
1934: Badminton Association of Malaya officially formed on 11 November, J.L. Woods of Perak becomes first President of BAM
1964: Badminton Association of Malaysia is formed

Tournaments
 Malaysia Open
 Malaysia Masters
 Malaysia International
 Malaysia International Junior Challenge 
 Malaysian National Badminton Championships
 PROTON National Circuit Kuala Lumpur Open

Controversy

Use of tournament bans on players who resigned from BAM
Badminton Association of Malaysia, as the national association, is the sole authority to register Malaysian players into Badminton World Federation-sanctioned tournaments, of which made up majority of the international badminton tournaments. On several occasions, BAM had refused to register players who have had left their fold.

In 2011, Tan Chun Seang was banned from Asian tournaments for two years after walking out from the national team. In 2019, Toh Ee Wei left BAM after a fallout with the association, and was barred from international tournaments as an independent player. Toh had since returned to BAM in 2020.

In September 2021, Goh Jin Wei resigned from the national team, citing health issues and explained that she "could never be able to fulfil the requirements and conditions of the national team". Goh instead signed as an independent player with Kuala Lumpur Racquet Club on 6 January 2022. On 19 January 2022, Lee Zii Jia decided to quit the team as he felt that the he couldn't withstand the pressure to be on the national team. In response, BAM sanctioned both Lee and Goh by banning both players for participating in any international events for 2 years. BAM deputy president Jahaberdeen Mohamed Yunoos said that the decision was made "to safeguard BAM's integrity as a national institution and custodian of the sport's national interest". The decision has caused anger among national and international fans, denouncing BAM decision. Danish badminton player and Olympic champion Viktor Axelsen condemn the sanctions as "crazy" and expressed solidarity with Lee and Goh. The same condemnation also expressed by other international badminton players like Anders Antonsen, Hans-Kristian Vittinghus, and Gronya Somerville. Supporters of the decision argued that Lee's premature exit from the national team may trigger other players to do same, and potentially losing sponsorship income for BAM. After a meeting between BAM and Lee on 25 January 2022, an agreement was reached with the ban to be lifted with terms yet to be disclosed.

Past Presidents
1934-1937 : John L. Woods
1947-1949 : Lim Chuan Geok
1949 : Heah Joo Seang
1950-1953 : Khoo Teik Ee
1954-1959 : Heah Joo Seang
1960 : Low Hoot Yeang
1961-1985 : Khir Johari
1985-1993 : Elyas Omar
1993-2000 : Abdullah Fadzil Che Wan
2000-2013 : Mohd Nadzmi Mohd Salleh
2013-2017 : Tengku Mahaleel Tengku Ariff
2015-2017 : Mohd Al-Amin Abdul Majid (Acting)

References

External links
 
 Badminton Association of Malaysia (BAM) - Tag Archive - Sports247.My

Malaysia
Badminton in Malaysia
Sports governing bodies in Malaysia
1964 establishments in Malaysia